Raymond Lee Brown is an American trumpeter and flugelhornist. Brown was  a longtime member of the Earth, Wind & Fire Horns.

Influences 
Brown was born and raised  in South Central Los Angeles. While in high school, Brown was friends with Gary Bias, Gerald Albright, Patrice Rushen, and Leon "Ndugu" Chancler. In the mid 1980s, he became a member of the Pan Afrikan Peoples Arkestra or "the Ark", of South Park, Los Angeles.  During 1987 Brown joined Earth, Wind & Fire alongside two other members of the Ark, saxophonist Bias and trombonist Reggie Young.  Before Earth, Wind & Fire, Brown was a member of Madagascar, a group composed of session musicians that recorded one album — Spirit of the Street — under the Arista label in 1981.

Performances 
In 1997, Brown was a member of Whitney Houston's band on her Pacific Rim Tour. Brown was also the solo flugelhorn player for Yanni in 1995 (Yanni: Live at Royal Albert Hall). Brown gave a practically flawless flugelhorn performance of the Yanni composition “Dance With a Stranger.”

Discography 
Earth, Wind & Fire
 Evil Roy, Columbia Records (1987); 
 Millennium, Reprise Records (1993); 
 In the Name of Love, Rhino Records (distributor) (1997); 
 The Promise, Kalimba (2003); 
 Live by Request, SMV Enterprises (2002); 
 Live in Japan (DVD video, CD audio, DVD audio), Eagle Rock Entertainment (2008); 

Sideman with Patrice Rushen (jazz)
 Patrice, Elektra Records 6E-160-A (1978); 
 Pizzazz, Elektra Records 243 (1979; 
 Signature, Discovery Records (1997); 
 Posh, Elektra Records (1980); 
 Straight From The Heart, Elektra Records (1982)

Sideman with jazz artists
 Donald Byrd, Places and Spaces, Blue Note Records BN-XW726-Y (1975); 
 Manfredo Fest, Manifestations, Tabu Records JZ35636 (1978); 
 Hubert Laws, Land of Passion, Columbia Records JC35708 (1979); 
 Hubert Laws, Make It Last, Columbia Records (1983); 
 Gerald Wilson's Orchestra of the 90s, Jenna, Discovery Records (1985); 
 Norman Brown, Just Between Us Motown 37463-7000-4 (1992); 
 Norman Brown, After the Storm, Mo Jazz (1994); 
 Art Porter, Jr., Straight to the Point, Verve Forecast 314-517997-2 (1993); 
 George Duke, Is Love Enough, Warner Bros. Records 46494 (1997); 
 Vernell Brown, Jr., Stay Tuned, A&M Records 75021-5382-2 (1992); 
 Kiyotaka Sugiyama, Add Water, Warner Music Japan Inc. (1994); 
 Daryle Chinn, From the Heart, Motown (1996); 
 Norman Brown, Better Days Ahead, Motown (1996); 
 Art Porter, Jr., For Art's Sake, Verve Forecast (1998); 

Sideman with funk, soul, and R&B artists
 Parlet, Play Me or Trade Me, Casablanca Records (1980); 
 Con Funk Shun, Spirit of Love, Mercury Records 6337 102 (1980); 
 Madagascar, Spirit Of The Street, Arista Records AL 9565 (1981); 
 Marvin Gaye, In Our Lifetime, Tamla T8-374M1
 Chuck Cissel, If I Had The Chance, Arista Records (1982)
 DeBarge, All This Love, Motown (1982); 
 Billy Griffin, Respect, Columbia Records FC 38924 (1983); 
 Whitney Houston, I'm Your Baby Tonight, Arista Records (1990); 
 Salif Keita, Amen, Mango Records (1991); 
 Tony! Toni! Toné!, Sons of Soul, PolyGram (1993); 
 Cleopatra, Comin' Atcha!, Maverick Records (1998); 
 Sandro, Clásico Sony Records (1994); 
 Lou Rawls, Seasons 4 U, Rawls & Brokaw Records (1998); 
 Lionel Richie, Renaissance, Island Records (2000);

Notes

American jazz trumpeters
American male trumpeters
Living people
Musicians from Gary, Indiana
Musicians from Indiana
Place of birth missing (living people)
Jacobs School of Music alumni
Year of birth missing (living people)
Earth, Wind & Fire members
American male jazz musicians